Fogo Island is a town located on Fogo Island, the largest of the offshore islands in the province of Newfoundland and Labrador, Canada.

History 
The Town of Fogo Island was incorporated on March 1, 2011 following the amalgamation of four towns – Fogo, Joe Batt's Arm-Barr'd Islands-Shoal Bay, Seldom-Little Seldom and Tilting – with the unincorporated balance of the Fogo Island.

Demographics 

Climate

Transportation 
Fogo Island is accessible by ferry or air. The local airstrip is the Fogo Aerodrome.

Notable people 
Zita Cobb – founder of Shorefast
Rob Furlong -  world record holder for longest recorded sniper kill March 2002 - November 2009

See also 
Fogo Island Inn
List of communities in Newfoundland and Labrador

References

External links 
Town of Fogo Island

2011 establishments in Newfoundland and Labrador
 
Road-inaccessible communities of Newfoundland and Labrador
Populated coastal places in Canada
Towns in Newfoundland and Labrador
Fishing communities in Canada